Oberheim Matrix synthesizers were a product line of subtractive analog synthesizers from Oberheim featuring a system of modulation which Oberheim called "Matrix Modulation" as a method of selecting and routing elements that dynamically shape various aspects of the sounds it produces.  Matrix synthesizers continue to be popular due to their characteristic late-1980s analog sound and leading patching and filter capabilities.

These five products fall into two groups.  The  Xpander is a six-voice rack-mount synthesizer with voltage-controlled oscillators and very flexible voltage-controlled filters.  The Matrix-12 is in effect two Xpander's plus a keyboard.  The second group consists of the Matrix-6 synthesizer, with DCOs, and much more standard filter capability.  It had two rack-mount variants, the Matrix-6R and Matrix-1000.

Models

References

Further reading

External links
 VintageSynth.com has specifications and photos
 OB6000.de The Editor for the Matrix 1000
 Xplorer A realtime editor for the Oberheim Matrix-12 and Xpander synthesizers

Matrix
analog synthesizers
polyphonic synthesizers